Signaling lymphocytic activation molecule 1 is a protein that in humans is encoded by the SLAMF1 gene. Recently SLAMF1 has also been designated CD150 (cluster of differentiation 150).

SLAMF1 belongs to the signaling lymphocytic activation molecule family. The interaction of SLAMF1 promoter and enhancers with the Early B-cell factor 1 (EBF1) is required for the expression of SLAMF1 gene in B cells. STAT6, IRF4, and NF-kB factors involved in the transfer of the signals from the B-cell receptor, its co-receptors and IL-4R, also play important role in the regulation of SLAMF1 expression.

Interactions 

SLAMF1 has been shown to interact with PTPN11, SH2D1A and SH2D1B.

References

Further reading

External links 
 

Clusters of differentiation